Phoenix Dance Theatre is a dance company based in Leeds, West Yorkshire, England, that has grown from small beginnings in inner-city Leeds to be one of Britain’s leading contemporary dance companies. The company tours nationally and internationally.

History 
Phoenix Dance Company was formed in 1981 in the inner-city Harehills area of Leeds by three young men – David Hamilton (Artistic Director), Donald Edwards and Vilmore James – who had begun dancing at Harehills Middle School. They were taught there by Nadine Senior, who went on to be the first principal of Northern School of Contemporary Dance. By the summer of 1982 Phoenix had acquired two other dancers, Merville Jones and Edward Lynch, both members of Harehills Youth Dance Theatre in Leeds, and in 1985 the company moved to its first permanent base in Chapeltown.

In 1987 David Hamilton left the company to pursue a solo career, and in July Neville Campbell joined Phoenix as Artistic Director. In 1990 Phoenix won the Grand Prize at the International Choreographic Competition in Bagnolet for Aletta Collins' piece Gang of Five and was nominated for the Laurence Olivier Award for the Most Outstanding Achievement of the Year in Dance.

Under Artistic Director Margaret Morris, who joined the company in 1991, Phoenix became established on the UK touring circuit and performed internationally particularly in the USA.

Following Margaret Morris' departure in 1997, Artistic Director Thea Nerissa Barnes led the company until 2000. In July 1998 Phoenix was commissioned by the BBC to perform with Roni Size at the Windrush Gala concert, which was broadcast nationally.

Artistic Directors
David (Leo) Hamilton (1981 – 1987)
Neville Campbell (1987 – 1991)
Margaret Morris (1991 – 1996)
Thea Narissa Barnes (1997 – 2000)
Darshan Singh Bhuller (2002 – 2006)
Javier De Frutos (2006 – 2008)
Sharon Watson (2009 – 2020 )
Dane Hurst (2021 – present)

Phoenix Dance Theatre 
Darshan Singh Bhuller was appointed as Artistic Director in 2002 and oversaw a complete rebranding of the company, changing the name to Phoenix Dance Theatre. During his tenure as Artistic Director from 2002 to 2006 Phoenix also began performing in predominantly large-scale venues.

He was succeeded as Artistic Director by Javier de Frutos, during whose tenure Phoenix won the "Company Prize for Outstanding Repertoire (Modern)" in the Critics' Circle National Dance Awards, 2006. In 2007 the company was invited to perform at the 5th International Festival of Contemporary Dance - La Biennale di Venezia, closing the festival with the final performance.

Sharon Watson 
Sharon Watson became the seventh Artistic Director of Phoenix Dance Theatre in May 2009, continuing a relationship with the company that stretches over 20 years. She first joined Phoenix as a dancer under the stage name Chantal Donaldson from 1989 to 1997, during which time she choreographed the pieces Shaded Limits and Never Still for the company.

She returned to Phoenix in 2000 as Rehearsal and Tour Director, following which she embarked upon a fellowship with the Clore Leadership Programme, while continuing her freelance work mentoring emerging artists, lecturing in vocational dance schools and delivering bespoke training programmes.

In 2008 Watson was one of 26 aspiring leaders from around the globe selected to attend Dance East’s fourth Rural Retreat, an intensive four-day think-tank exploring the challenges of the role of Artistic Directors in the 21st century. Prior to taking up post at Phoenix she also spent eight months as Director of Learning and Access at Northern Ballet Theatre.

In 2010 she was named as one of the Cultural Leadership Programme’s Women to Watch, a list of 50 influential women working in arts and culture in the UK selected by a distinguished panel made up of figures from the cultural and creative industries.

New building 
In autumn 2010 Phoenix moved from its home of more than 20 years at Yorkshire Dance into a purpose-built dance centre in the centre of Leeds, alongside Northern Ballet. It is the largest space for dance outside London and is the only space for dance to house a national classical and a national contemporary dance company alongside each another.

Current repertoire 

Mixed Programme 2021
 " BERNSTEIN DOUBLE BILL " - Choreographer Dane Hurst
 40 YEARS OF PHOENIX

Mixed Programme 2019
 " THE RITE OF SPRING " - Choreographer Jeanguy Saintus
 LEFT UNSEEN  - Choreographer Amaury Lebrun

Mixed Programme 2018
 " Kirke" - Choreographer Sandrine Monin
 Windrush: Movement of the People - Choreographer Sharon Watson
 Calyx - Choreographer Sandrine Monin
 Shadows - Choreographer Christopher Bruce

Mixed Programme 2017

 REfined - Choreographer Sharon Watson

Mixed Programme 2016

 Undivided Love - Choreographer Kate Flatt

Mixed Programme 2015

 Shift - Choreographer Christopher Bruce CBE
 Shadows - Choreographer Christopher Bruce CBE
 TearFall - Choreographer Sharon Watson
 Bloom - Choreographer Caroline Finn

Mixed Programme 2014
 See Blue Through - Choreographer Didy Veldman 
 Document - Choreographers Uri Ivgi and Johan Greben
 Mapping - Choreographer Darshan Singh Bhuller

Particle Velocity Programme 2013
 All Alight - Choreographer Richard Alston
 Ki - Choreographer Jose Agudo
 Tender Crazy Love - Choreographer Douglas Thorpe
 Repetition of Change - Choreographer Sharon Watson

Crossing Points Programme 2012
 Signal - Choreographer Henri Oguike
 Catch - Choreographer Ana Lujan Sanchez
 Maybe Yes Maybe, Maybe No Maybe - Choreographer Aletta Collins 
 SoundClash - Choreographer Kwesi Johnson
Reflected Programme Spring 2011
Switch - Choreographer Richard Wherlock
What It Is - Choreographer Philip Taylor
Pave Up Paradise - Choreographer Lost Dog
Melt - Choreographer Sharon Watson

Declarations Programme Autumn 2010
 The Audacious One - Choreographer Warren Adams
 Locked In Vertical - Choreographer Isira Makuloluwe
 Haunted Passages - Choreographer Philip Taylor
 Maybe Yes Maybe, Maybe No Maybe - Choreographer Aletta Collins

Leeds in Barcelona Spring 2010
 Never 2 Still - Choreographer Sharon Watson

Ignite Programme Autumn 2009 / Spring 2010
 1976 - Choreographer Alesandra Seutin
 Beast - Choreographer Douglas Thorpe
 Class - Choreographer Darshan Singh Bhuller
 Fast Lane - Choreographer Sharon Watson

Current dancers  
Aaron Chaplin 
Alana Cowie
Alabama Seymour 
Charlie Nayler
Matthew Topliss
Megan Lumsden
Melina Sofocleus 
Shawn Willis
Reynaldo Junior Santos
Yuma Sylla

References

External links 
Phoenix Dance Theatre website
Phoenix Dance Theatre YouTube channel

Dance companies in the United Kingdom
Organisations based in Leeds
Culture in West Yorkshire